North St. George Church is a Romanian Orthodox church located at 20 Independenței Boulevard in Focșani, Romania. It is dedicated to Saint George.

The church was founded by the inhabitants of the Ocol quarter. A stone inscription on the floor indicates an 1819 construction date. The detached bell tower also served as an observation post for fires.

The ship-shaped church has a closed porch, a nave and altar. The foundation is stone, the walls of masonry. The porch and attic are linked by a wooden staircase on the north side. The nave is topped by a spire painted with Christ Pantocrator; it is cylindrical on the exterior, polygonal on the interior, with windows on each face. The facade is divided into two horizontal registers by a row of bricks. Each register is further divided into rectangular sections by columns. On the lower side, the columns enclose windows; on the upper, rectangular niches painted with saints’ portraits. The entry is protected by a glass and cast iron extension.

The church is listed as a historic monument by Romania's Ministry of Culture and Religious Affairs, as is the 1839 tower.

Notes

Religious buildings and structures in Focșani
Historic monuments in Vrancea County
Romanian Orthodox churches in Vrancea County
Churches completed in 1819